is a Japanese multinational tire manufacturer founded in 1931 by Shojiro Ishibashi (1889–1976) in the city of Kurume, Fukuoka, Japan.

As of 2021, Bridgestone/Firestone is the largest manufacturer of tires in the world, followed by Michelin in France, Goodyear in the United States, MRF in India, Continental in Germany and Pirelli in Italy.

Bridgestone Group has 181 production facilities in 24 countries as of July 2018.

History

Origins
The history of Bridgestone America dates back to the two separate companies that merged to form Bridgestone Tire company. The first one is Firestone Tire & Rubber Company, that was founded in August 1900 by Harvey Firestone and was headquartered in Akron, Ohio. The second one is the Bridgestone Tire Company, Ltd., founded in 1931 by Shojiro Ishibashi in Japan. The first Bridgestone tire was produced on 9 April 1930, by the Japanese "Tabi" Socks Tire Division (actually made jika-tabi).  One year later on 1 March 1931, the founder, Shojiro Ishibashi, made the "Tabi" Socks Tire Division independent and established the Bridgestone Tire Co., Ltd. in the city of Kurume, Fukuoka Prefecture. "Bridgestone" was named after the name of the founder, Shojiro Ishibashi.

Foregoing dependence on European and North American technology, the Bridgestone Tire Co., Ltd. set its eyes on manufacturing tires based largely on Japanese technology.  The fledgling company experienced many difficulties in the areas of technology, production, and sales in the early days.  Eventually, improvements were achieved in quality and manufacturing processes which led to the business rapidly expanding in domestic and overseas markets.

Challenges during and after World War II
Wartime regulations were in effect throughout Japan during World War II, and tires also came under the jurisdiction of these regulations.  This resulted in nearly all of the company's output being used to satisfy military demand.  1945 saw the end of armed conflict, but the company was devastated by the war. The Tokyo headquarters was destroyed during an aerial bombing raid, and all overseas assets were lost.  The plants in Kurume and Yokohama escaped unscathed, and production was able to resume immediately after the war ended.  Brushing aside the problems caused by a labour union strike that lasted for forty-six days, the foundations of the company were further reinforced after this.

After the war the company started making bicycles, with the Bridgestone Cycle Company being formed in 1949. From 1952 the first complete powered bicycles were produced, with a 26cc engine. In 1958 the first 50cc Bridgestone motorcycles were manufactured, but the company's main income was from supplying tires to its rival motorcycle makers such as Honda, Suzuki and Yamaha and it was later decided to cease motorcycle manufacturing.

In 1952, Ishibashi founded the Bridgestone Museum of Art and located it at 10 Kyobashi 1-chome, Chuo-ku, Tokyo 104; Bridgestone Corporation's company headquarters.

Technological innovation

In 1951, Bridgestone was the first company in Japan to begin selling rayon cord tires, and a five-year project to modernize production facilities was started.  This year also saw another Bridgestone building opened in Kyōbashi, Tokyo, which contained the Bridgestone Museum.  Sales surpassed ten billion yen in 1953, placing Bridgestone at the top of the tire industry in Japan, and celebrations were held to commemorate the 25th anniversary of the company's foundation in Kurume.

The sale of nylon tires was started in 1959, and work forged ahead with the construction of the new Tokyo plant, which was opened in 1960, in order to cope with the fast-expanding market for motorization.

Radial tires and overseas expansion
The company issued stock shares and was listed on the stock exchange in 1961. A new system of administration was ushered in by Shojiro Ishibashi as the chairman, and Kanichiro Ishibashi as the president.  As part of the transition across to administrative reform, the Deming Plan in honor of W. Edwards Deming, which involves overall quality control activities, was adopted, and the company was awarded the prestigious Deming Prize in 1968. Also, additions were built onto the Tokyo plant in 1962 to house the new Technical Centre, and a progressive system of research and development was established. On the product front, 1967 saw the sale of the company's first ever radial tire, the RD10.

Bridgestone's first overseas plant since the end of the war was opened in Singapore in 1965, and production was also commenced in Thailand in 1969.  The 1960s for Bridgestone was an era of overseas expansion that also included the establishment of Bridgestone America in the United States in 1967 to act as Bridgestone's USA representative sales branch.

At the start of the period of Japan's economic stagnation, brought about by the first oil shock, the company was placing even more emphasis on establishing its own technology for the manufacture of radial tires, and it was also at this time that further domestic plants were constructed and fitted out.  Its Super Filler Radial was placed on the market in 1978, and in 1979 the company introduced the high-performance POTENZA radial tire, from an Italian word for power.

The company was actively engaged in overseas expansion activities at this time. In addition to starting up production in Indonesia and Iran in 1976, it also invested in a Taiwan tire manufacturer and purchased a tire plant and a plant for diversified products in Australia in 1980. The founder, Shojiro Ishibashi, died on 11 September 1976.

On 1 March 1981, the company celebrated its 50th anniversary. At the same time, the company initiated activities to strengthen its home base that supported overseas expansion strategy with the aim of being ranked as one of the world's top three manufacturers of rubber products. New production facilities were also established in Thailand, India, Poland, China, the United States and other countries. The company changed the name from Bridgestone Tire Co., Ltd. to Bridgestone Corporation in 1984.

Firestone purchase
In 1988, Bridgestone purchased the Firestone Tire and Rubber Company of Akron, Ohio.  Placing considerable financial and personnel resources into rebuilding Firestone after the purchase, Bridgestone achieved surplus annual profits for the year 1992 with BFE (Bridgestone Firestone Europe) and again in 1993 with BFS (Bridgestone Firestone USA).  The Firestone Tire and Rubber Company and Bridgestone Tire Company Ltd. USA were amalgamated in 1990 and became "Bridgestone Firestone North American Holdings Ltd". The North American subsidiary of Bridgestone Corporation is now named Bridgestone Americas, Inc. The tire division is Bridgestone Americas Tire Operations, LLC. Bridgestone Americas opened a $100 million technical center in Akron in 2012.

Bridgestone's global locations
Bridgestone has major manufacturing plants in many countries around the world.  As of 1 April 2011, Bridgestone has 47 tire plants, 29 tire-related plants, 19 raw materials plants, 89 diversified product plants, 4 technical centers, and 11 proving grounds globally. Some of the major plants are located in:

Australia
Bridgestone Australia began as the SA Rubber Mills in 1939.  In 1980 Bridgestone took over the Australian plants which were at that time operated by the Uniroyal Tyre Company.  Bridgestone Australia had a major manufacturing tire factory in Australia: located in Salisbury, South Australia (this plant was eventually decommissioned in April 2011). Bridgestone has State Offices in all states of Australia, and has a large number of retail outlets across the country.

In 2000 Bridgestone Australia Ltd. purchased the BANDAG Retreading plant and its operations in Australia.  Bandag Manufacturing Pty Limited has 35 franchised dealers across Australia, New Zealand, Fiji, Papua New Guinea and Nouméa. Bandag Manufacturing Pty Limited is a wholly owned subsidiary of Bridgestone Australia Limited, and operates under license to Bandag Incorporated. In 2006 Bridgestone purchased Bandag Incorporated, which is now a subsidiary of Bridgestone Corporation.

From the purchase in 1981, the Australian operations of Bridgestone have been run as a publicly listed company on the Australian Stock exchange.  Bridgestone Corporation has maintained a majority share holding.  As of mid-2007 the Australian operation was delisted from the Australian Stock exchange and became a solely owned Division of Bridgestone Corporation (pending minority shareholder approval as per Australian Corporate Law).

Following the cancellation on Friday, 11 May 2007, of all shares held by minority shareholders, Bridgestone Australia Ltd. became a wholly owned subsidiary of Bridgestone Corporation of Japan.  The selective capital reduction and subsequent privatisation which cost $49 million was approved and completed. Bridgestone Australia Ltd. was delisted from the ASX on 30 May 2007.

Europe
Bridgestone EU has its head office in Brussels, Belgium, and was set up in 1990 as Bridgestone/Firestone Europe SA. Before that, a representative office in Belgium set up in 1972 and sales subsidiary companies and importers in each countries were selling products imported from Japan.  There are 7 production plants in the region and a 32 hectare research and development centre near Rome, Italy.  The company distributes more than 25 million tires a year through 17 national sales subsidiaries and 2 distributors.  They directly employ over 12,000 people with Mr. Tsuda as the CEO.

At present there are national headquarters in the following locations: Vienna, Austria; Prague, Czech Republic; Hinnerup, Denmark; Vantaa, Finland; Fresnes, France; Bad Homburg, Germany; Athens, Greece; Budapest, Hungary; Dublin, Ireland; Milan, Italy; Moerdijk, Netherlands; Oslo, Norway; Warsaw, Poland; Alcochete, Portugal; Madrid, Spain; Sundsvall, Sweden; Spreitenbach, Switzerland; Istanbul, Turkey and Warwick, UK; Ulyanovsk, Russia.

Bridgestone EU runs a continent-wide scheme called Truckpoint wherein fleets can take their vehicles to any Bridgestone approved garage throughout Europe and get Bridgestone specialist work carried out on their tires.

There are no Bridgestone factories in the UK but there is a technical bay at which tyres returned by dissatisfied customers are inspected in Coventry.

North America
As part of reinforcement plans, the company purchased a plant in Tennessee from the Firestone Tire and Rubber Company, its first manufacturing plant in North America, and started the production of radial tires for trucks and buses in 1983. Bridgestone also has a steel cord plant in Clarksville, Tennessee, named Bridgestone Metalpha.  Metalpha is currently ranked as the top provider in the global steel cord market.

In May 1988, a takeover bid of America's No. 2 tire manufacturer, Akron, Ohio-based Firestone, was successful, and Firestone was placed under the Bridgestone umbrella as a subsidiary company. This purchase brought a large number of Firestone global production sites into the Bridgestone organization. These sites included North America, Central and South America, Europe, New Zealand and other locations. Bridgestone also commenced production in Turkey. In 1992, the company established regional corporate offices in Europe and the Americas.

Nashville-based Bridgestone Americas, Inc. (BSA) is the American subsidiary of the Bridgestone Corporation. BSA and its subsidiaries develop, manufacture and market Bridgestone, Firestone, and associate brand tires for consumers, automotive and commercial vehicle original equipment manufacturers, and those in the agricultural, forestry and mining industries.  The companies also produce air springs, roofing materials, synthetic rubber and industrial fibers and textiles and operate the world's largest chain of automotive tire and service centers.

In November 2010, ASA Automotive Systems Inc. was selected by the Consumer Tire Sales division of Bridgestone Americas Tire Operations, LLC (BATO) as the software provider for their North American consumer dealers to supply the industry's leading 'All-in-One' Point-of-Sale, Accounting and Inventory shop management software.

In 2014, Bridgestone Americas Tire Operations (BATO) unveiled its newly rebranded GCR Tires & Service division.  With one of the largest network of commercial stores across the country, GCR's reach extends nationwide.  The letters of GCR reflect the last names of the original company founders Balie Griffith, Harold Crawford and Perry Rose.

In 2015, Bridgestone Americas Inc. signed a deal giving its dealers the option to install digital air calibration machines from Excel Tire Gauge Inc. in their stores. The digital air calibration machines streamline the tire inflation process by automatically inflating or deflating tires.

In 2017, Bridgestone Americas consolidated many of their business units into a single building in downtown Nashville, Bridgestone Tower. Nearly 2,000 employees work in the new skyscraper, nestled between the Country Music Hall of Fame and the Schermerhorn Symphony Center.

In April 2020, due to demand by essential service providers during COVID-19 pandemic in Tennessee, Bridgestone Americas announced plans to restart its North American commercial tire plants as well as its North American Firestone Industrial Products and Firestone Building Products manufacturing facilities.

Sports sponsorships

Formula racing

Bridgestone started to invest in motorsport in the 1980s by developing race tires for feeder series like Formula 2, Formula 3, Formula Ford, Formula Opel Lotus and karting.

In order to increase the Firestone subsidiary's brand awareness, Bridgestone Firestone NAH Ltd, re-entered the Firestone brand into CART IndyCar open-wheel racing in 1995 to challenge Goodyear. The tires proved better and Goodyear retired for 2000. Since then, Firestone has been the single tire provider for the renamed and disappeared Champ Car, the IndyCar Series and its feeder series Firestone Indy Lights until 2013.

Bridgestone has supplied tires in Formula One since , although the company one-off produced Formula One tires at the 1976 and 1977 Japanese Grand Prix for Japanese entrants such as Kazuyoshi Hoshino's Heros Racing and Kojima.

The Japanese company decided to supply tires for Formula One in 1995, backed-up by the CEO Yoichiro Kaizaki, aiming to improve Bridgestone's name value in the European market which was greatly inferior compared with their archrivals, Michelin. Though it was scheduled to enter the championship in the 1998 season at first, this was brought forward to  because the engineering section led by Hirohide Hamashima had quickly advanced development. Thus, Hiroshi Yasukawa, the general manager of Motorsport Department, also made the best use of the experience and networks in Europe since the Bridgestone's European F2 era (–) and constructed logistics for Formula One at once.

The first title was acquired right away in the second year, 1998 by Mika Häkkinen and McLaren-Mercedes. And Bridgestone users took five Drivers' Championship titles and five Constructors' Championship titles (–) for the period that competed with Goodyear (–) and Michelin (–). Especially, cooperation with Scuderia Ferrari and Michael Schumacher functioned well in this period.

From 2008 to 2010 Bridgestone was due to be the sole tire supplier to the FIA Formula One World Championship. However, because Michelin chose to conclude its Formula One tire programme at the end of the 2006 season, all teams used Bridgestone tires from the 2007 season to the 2010 Formula One season.

On 2 November 2009 Bridgestone announced that they would not be renewing their contract to supply tires to Formula One teams after 2010. The company said it was "addressing the impact of the continuing evolution of the business environment". Pirelli announced in June 2010 that it would serve as sole supplier for tires in the 2011 season.

Sports car and touring car racing
In the 1980s and 1990s, Bridgestone provided tires to the Le Mans sport prototypes of teams Nismo and TOM's, backed by Japanese automobile manufacturers Nissan and Toyota respectively. In the early 1990s, Bridgestone expanded to Mercedes-AMG, which entered the DTM and later Le Mans and the FIA GT Championship. The brand left international sports car racing in 2000, but remains as one of the main suppliers in the Japanese Super GT championship.

Motorcycling
In 2002, Bridgestone entered the Grand Prix motorcycle racing's main class MotoGP. From 2009 to 2015, it was the exclusive tire supplier of the championship and reached the milestone of 100 MotoGP victories in 2012. Nine-time World Champion Valentino Rossi was 'Bridgestone Tyre Adviser' having won two MotoGP titles on Bridgestone tires in 2008 and 2009.

In May 2014, Bridgestone announced they would leave Moto GP at the end of the 2015 season.

Other sports
Bridgestone is the official tire of the National Football League, National Hockey League and the Olympic Games. In addition, it is the title sponsor of the NHL's flagship event, the Winter Classic outdoor game. In 2010, Bridgestone acquired the naming rights to the home venue of the NHL's Nashville Predators calling it Bridgestone Arena. They are also the title sponsor of the Copa Libertadores, the top competition for South American club football. They were also the title sponsor for Copa Sudamericana from 2011 to 2013.

Diversified products
The predecessors of Bridgestone began making diversified products in the 1930s, soon after they started making tires. Today, Bridgestone diversified operations encompass automotive components, industrial products, polyurethane foam products, construction materials, parts and materials for electronic equipment, bicycles and sporting goods. Diversified business generates about one-fourth of total sales in the Bridgestone Group.

Automotive parts are an especially large line of business for Bridgestone in diversified operations. Bridgestone supplies automakers with vibration-isolating components, such as engine mounts. Bridgestone also supplies air springs for trucks, automobiles and train carriages. Bridgestone market aluminium wheels and other automotive accessories, too.

Industrial products
Bridgestone's industrial products span a vast range, including polyurethane foam for automotive seats and interiors, for bedding and furniture and for insulation and sealing in appliances and buildings; water hoses; marine hoses for loading and unloading oil tankers; specialty precision hose products, such as wire-blade hose for construction equipment and machine tools; conveyor belts; and rubber tracks for crawler tractors. Additionally, they make retreaded tires for aircraft. Their corporate headquarters for the Bridgestone Aircraft tire division is located in Miami in the United States.

The Bridgestone product line in construction and civil engineering materials is similarly broad. Bridgestone supply Multi-Rubber Bearings for installing in foundations to protect buildings from earthquakes, inflatable rubber dams for managing waterways (no longer manufactured – 2008), marine fenders for protecting wharves, additives for pavement, waterproofing sheet, rubberized ceiling and roofing materials, panel tanks for storing water, bath fixtures and residential flooring, air and water systems.

Bridgestone's line of products for electronic equipment includes precision rollers for office machines and functional films for solar cells and plasma displays. In sporting goods, Bridgestone market golf balls and clubs and tennis balls and rackets. Bridgestone's line of bicycles is Japan's most extensive – see above information re. Anchor Cycles.

Bridgestone Commercial Services Group (Bandag)

On 5 December 2006, Bridgestone Americas and Bandag Inc. announced a merger agreement whereby Bridgestone would acquire Muscatine, Iowa-based Bandag, Inc., a leading truck tire re-treader that was founded in 1957 and had over 900 franchised dealers worldwide at the time.  In announcing the merger, Bridgestone's president in Tokyo explained:  
The transaction was valued at approximately US$1.05 billion. On 31 May 2007, the agreement was consummated and Bridgestone Americas acquired the outstanding shares of Bandag stock for US$50.75 per share. The unit was renamed Bridgestone Bandag, LLC and Saul Solomon was appointed to the position of chairman, CEO and President.  Previously, Solomon served as Vice President and General Counsel of BSAH. 
In the four years following the acquisition, Bandag's headquarters remained in Muscatine, although some processes and functions were consolidated and/or transferred to other facilities.  In November 2010, corporate headquarters were moved to Nashville. In May 2011, the unit was renamed Bridgestone Commercial Services Group, eliminating the name "Bandag."

Bicycles

The Bridgestone Cycle Co Ltd originated in 1949. It offers bicycles under its own brand and under the Anchor brand.

At one time, Bridgestone marketed bicycles under the name Kabuki.

The U.S. marketing director of the Bicycle division, Grant Petersen, developed a reputation for resisting popular trends in the bicycle industry and instead followed his own personal philosophy of building dependable and comfortable bicycles. Peterson applied this approach to Rivendell Bicycle Works after Bridgestone stopped marketing bicycles in the U.S.

The company was an innovator in the nascent mountain bike scene, designing mountain bikes with shorter chain-stays and steeper frame angles than then popular. This made it more nimble and a better climber.

Until 1986, Bridgestone models were numbered in multiples of 100, with the higher numbers indicating a higher end bike.  The entry level road bike in 1986, for example, may have been the Bridgestone 100, while the Bridgestone 700 would have been a competition level race bike.  Beginning in 1987 there was a change, with model designations consisting of two letters followed by a numeral.  The letters indicated the type of bike, and the number indicated the position in the product lineup.  The numbering was also reversed, with the smaller numbers indicating a higher position in the product line.  For example, the RB-1 would have been the top-of-the-line road bike, followed by the RB-2, RB-3, etc.

Bridgestone is currently building frames in Japan for keirin track racing under Nihon Jitensha Shinkokai approved standards. It is currently producing non-NJS frames for the Japanese market as well.

In Japan, it is known as a manufacturer of utility, mountain and (under the brand name Anchor) road racing bikes.

Bridgestone has also collaborated with Dr. Alex Moulton to produce the Bridgestone Moulton Bicycle and marketed its own folding bicycle, the Bridgestone Picnica.

Bridgestone also released a range of BMX Bicycles in 1981–1982 known as the MKI & MKII.

Motorcycles

Bridgestone motorcycles were a division of the company that produced mopeds and motorcycles from 1952 to 1970. Initially producing power assisted bicycles, the division moved on to producing mopeds and then motorcycles. The motorcycles were technologically advanced and powered by two-stroke engines. The high technical specification resulted in the machines being more expensive compared to other manufacturers models. Production was stopped in 1970 to protect the supply of tires to other manufacturers.

Bridgestone Aircraft Tire
Bridgestone Aircraft Tire (USA) is a manufacturer of aircraft tires as well as retread servicing. Bridgestone America's Holdings announced in May 2006 that it would be moving its Miami, Florida aviation operation to its new  facility located in Mayodan, North Carolina, this move is expected to be completed by mid-2007 and will create approximately 95 new jobs. CEO and President of Bridgestone Aircraft Tire (USA) Joe Rayna is quoted as saying; "This move allows us to continue to prepare for a changing market, both in demand and in product mix, New modern aircraft, such as the Boeing 787 Dreamliner and Airbus A380, arrive fitted with new Bridgestone technology aircraft tires, and this new facility will complement that technology". Bridgestone Aircraft Tire (USA) has been a major supplier of aircraft tires and retreads to the aircraft industry for over 70 years and has sister aviation facilities in Tokyo, Hong Kong and Belgium.

Golf products

Bridgestone Golf is a division of Bridgestone, and is the brand name under which Bridgestone's Golfing Products are marketed. Bridgestone has been producing golf-related products since 1935. The Golf division of Bridgestone currently produces clubs, balls and accessories.
Along with technical developments in tire technology came breakthroughs in golf ball technology that have led Bridgestone to be the number one golf ball producer in Japan.

Design and production of golf clubs followed in 1972.

Bridgestone has global coverage of its golfing products with major divisions in USA (Bridgestone Golf USA), Australia (Bridgestone Golf Australia) and Korea (Sokio Corporation).

Dolphin artificial caudal fin

In 2003, the caudal fin of Fuji, a Bottlenose dolphin bred at the Okichan Theater of Okinawa Churaumi Aquarium, was necrotic, necessitating the removal of 75% of the fin which made swimming impossible. The Okinawa Churaumi Aquarium started a project to develop the world's first artificial dolphin caudal fin in cooperation with Bridgestone to replace Fuji's fin. In the early days, the artificial caudal fin could not be installed well because it could not withstand the swimming of dolphins, but aquariums made improvements and succeeded in installing the artificial caudal fin of the dolphin.

In 2010, it was also installed in Pacific white-sided dolphin named Lanan, who was bred in Notojima Aquarium, and succeeded in installing the second artificial caudal fin in the world.

Bridgestone e-Reporter
Bridgestone e-reporter is a pan-European competition for aspiring young sports journalists, open to all students aged 18–30, who are in full-time education.

Now in its fifth year, Bridgestone e-reporter continues to provide up-and-coming writers with first hand experience, interviewing GP2 drivers and issuing race reports from a European GP2 race weekend.

The 2008 competition was officially launched on 1 February 2008 with the deadline for entries at 12.00 GMT on 31 March 2008. As of 2009, Bridgestone has not held further editions of the eReporter competition. However it may return in a different form in the future.

Bridgestone was the sole tire supplier for the GP2 series, an open-wheeled racing championship that is widely regarded as the feeder series for Formula One.

Controversies
In 2008, Bridgestone ran an advert during the Super Bowl XLII showing a car-driver avoiding several hazards while driving at night, including threatening to run down Richard Simmons, who was embodying a homophobic sissy stereotype, with Ad Ages critic Bob Garfield describing the advert as "grounded in homophobia".

In February 2014 Bridgestone agreed to a $425 million fine imposed by the United States Department of Justice for price fixing and bid rigging in the automotive parts industry. The company said it regretted the actions that led to the plea deal and said it would take disciplinary action against certain employees.

In February of 2022, shortly after outsourcing the majority of its IT employees, Bridgestone Americas was hacked. This resulted in the theft of company data, manufacturing plants in North and South America to be closed, and production to be halted.

See also
 Bridgestone Arena
 Bridgestone Golf
 Bridgestone Picnica
 Bridgestone Tower

References

External links

  Bridgestone Corporation English homepage
  Bridgestone Motorsport English homepage
  News | Bridgestone
 Bridgestone Bicycles Official site
  — Wiki collection of bibliographic works on Bridgestone.

 
Auto parts suppliers of Japan
Tire manufacturers of Japan
Cycle manufacturers of Japan
Motorcycle manufacturers of Japan
Mountain bike manufacturers
Multinational companies headquartered in Japan
Japanese companies established in 1931
Automotive companies established in 1931
1960s initial public offerings
Japanese brands
Companies listed on the Tokyo Stock Exchange
Formula One tyre suppliers